Philip Alexander Munz (1892–1974) was an American botanist, plant taxonomist and educator who worked at the Rancho Santa Ana Botanic Garden and was a professor of botany at Pomona College, serving as dean there for three years.

In 1935 Munz published his Manual of Southern California Botany. Munz compiled the voluminous A California Flora with David D. Keck, published by the University of California Press in 1959, and with a supplement published in 1968. Munz published A California Flora without any research support and with a relatively small subvention for publication from the University of California Press. In 1974, his book A Flora of Southern California was published posthumously, with the botanical families presented in an alphabetical order.

List of selected publications
Munz authored four popular plant guides for general readers interested in botany but untrained in plant taxonomy, published by the University of California Press, and referred to as the California Wildflower Books:

Honours
Several plants have been named after him including; Salvia munzii Epling, Cereus munzii Parish (= Echinocereus munzii (Parish) L.D. Benson), Iris munzii R.C. Foster, Layia munzii D.D. Keck, Opuntia munzii C.B. Wolf and the genus Munzothamnus P.H. Raven. (Asteraceae).

References

American botanical writers
American taxonomists
Botanists active in California
1892 births
1974 deaths
American information and reference writers
Scientists from California
Science and technology in Greater Los Angeles
Writers from California
Pomona College faculty
People from Claremont, California
20th-century American male writers
20th-century American botanists
20th-century American non-fiction writers
American male non-fiction writers